Yeh Zindagi Hai Gulshan is an Indian television drama series, which premiered on DD National on 26 February 2012. The series focuses on the concept of empowerment of women in Muslim society. The series originally aired every once a week on Sunday but was converted to a twice-weekly series on Saturdays and Sundays due to its popularity. The series is produced by Suhaib Ilyasi, director and the host of India's Most Wanted.

Cast
 Naziya Khan
  Himanshu Soni 
 Raza Murad
 Pankaj Dheer
 Anang Desai
 Zarina Wahab
 Upasana Singh
 Deep Ankur Batra
 Harsh Prajapati

References

DD National original programming
Indian drama television series
2012 Indian television series debuts